Alireza Azmandian persian:علیرضا آزمندیان (born 1953) is an Iranian Author, lecturer and motivational speaker  He received a Ph.D. in industrial and systems engineering at the University of Southern California. Azmandian established the cultural-scientific institute Padideh Fekr in 1997 in Iran to develop and teach the self-help system Technology of Thought.

Books
 Think Yourself Successful: Rewire Your Mind, Become Confident and Achieve Your Goals. 2010 McGraw-Hill,  / 9780071741248

References

External links
The official website

Writers from Tehran
1953 births
Living people
Iranian non-fiction writers